Laurențiu Budur (born 12 February 1963) is a Romanian bobsledder. He competed in the two man and the four man events at the 1992 Winter Olympics.

References

1963 births
Living people
Romanian male bobsledders
Olympic bobsledders of Romania
Bobsledders at the 1992 Winter Olympics
Place of birth missing (living people)